Dogomar Martínez (30 July 1929 – 7 February 2016) was a Uruguayan boxer. He competed in the men's middleweight event at the 1948 Summer Olympics.

References

1929 births
2016 deaths
Uruguayan male boxers
Olympic boxers of Uruguay
Boxers at the 1948 Summer Olympics
Sportspeople from Montevideo
Middleweight boxers